Mocorito (meaning "place of the dead") is a small city and its surrounding municipality in the Mexican state of Sinaloa.

The city reported 5,426 inhabitants in the 2010 census.

History
In 1531, with the entry of the conquistador Nuño de Guzmán to northwest Mexico and the founding of the town of San Miguel de Navito, the geographical boundaries of the province of Culiacan were set, subject to the governorship of Nueva Galicia. In 1532, Sebastián de Évora reached the Mocorito valley and called his name, the people and the river, leaving as encomendero dependent as mayor of the province of Culiacan, from that year was defined between the river towards Évora North and Elota River in the south. In 1594 the Mission Mocorito was founded by the Jesuits Juan Bautista Hernando de Velasco and Santarán. 

In 1732 when the Spanish arrived expansion beyond the Yaqui River, lays the territory divided into provinces. In this year rank first Sonora and Sinaloa to form a single governorship with head in the town of San Felipe and Santiago de Sinaloa, Sinaloa de Leyva today. In Sinaloa territory remained the internal division 3 provinces: Sinaloa, Culiacan, and Chametla, whose boundaries were May River north and south of Reeds. In 1749 the territory is divided into five provinces, and although apparently Mocorito came under the jurisdiction of the province of Culiacan in the ratio of "The Villages, Villas, places Indians and Royals Minas" stating their jurisdictions made in that time, appears within the jurisdiction of Culiacan, the peoples of Capirato, Comanito and Palos Blancos; and within the jurisdiction of Sinaloa, Mocorito mission and the people of San Benito. In 1813 the Constitution of Cadiz entered into force; Article 310 provides for the installation of municipalities in populations that had more than 1,000 inhabitants. In 1814, Fernando VII repealed the constitution but reinstalled it during 1820. From the moment the first municipalities in Sinaloa are installed.

The creation of the internal state of the West in 1824 uniting the provinces of Sonora and Sinaloa, and the internal division of the state into five departments with their respective parties, does not alter the internal situation of Sinaloa territory in regard to Mocorito, since the Culiacán department is formed with the game of his name and Cosalá, comprising Mocorito region within the same, within the limits of the river its name to the river Elota.

In 1830 the final separation of Sonora and Sinaloa decreed to form their independent states. The new state of Sinaloa was divided into eleven districts, being Mocorito one, comprising within its jurisdiction, the boundaries that mark on the north side of the coast, the town of Playa Colorada, and towards the mountains, the town of Corral Quemado, adjoining district Badiraguato; by the same mountain, south bordering on the district and the town of Culiacan Ocualtita; towards Jesús María almost reaching the coast, the town of Aguapepe and Awnings, opposite the island of Tachichilte. Mocorito was erected municipality by decree published on April 8, 1915. In 1916 Mocorito suffer a reduction in their geographical extension to become political in Municipality Directorate of Angostura. In 1962 suffers a further reduction to settle the town of Salvador Alvarado.

Origin of the name
Don Hector Rodelo Olea said that Mocorito is a variant of the Cahita word "Macori-to", composed of Macuri, short for "macorihui" a voice alteration "macoyahuy" objective applied to a fraction of the Mayo Indians or people who speak a dialect the Cahita language; Further, the position "to" denoting location, place; the place name means "place of nations who speak a dialect of Cahita tongue, or inhabited by Mayo Indians or macoritos".

Other historians, like Eustaquio Buelnal, prefer the translation of Mocorito as "place of the dead".

Meaning of the shield
Finding Mayor Eng. Luis Verduzco Leal, shield Township Mocorito was developed in 1964 by Mr. Miguel Angel Velazquez Tracy, shaping oval, tronchado band and quartered, with bordura imitating stone in honor of Indian origin, in ignorance Metal and footprints oriented northwest and southeast in greater numbers and from southeast to northwest lesser number, meaning nahoa pilgrimage to give Sinaloa population, and Mocorito in particular.In the first quarter sable coat background is seen, meaning the darkness of prehistory.

The second quarter, enamelled purple to signify the dawn of history Mocorito. Substance and orange, a building of defense, meaning the city of San Miguel de Culiacán; south another figure in blue formed by two strong arms that mean the Humaya river and Tamazula. Leaving these figures orange band passing over a thinner band blue which means the road from Culiacan and passing over the river to the Petatlán Mocorito, also representing the Villa de San Felipe y Santiago.

In the third quarter, silver background, a chapel of indigenous stroke, dated 1594, meaning the foundation's mission Mocorito.

In the fourth quarter, gold background symbolizing the zenith of colonial history, the present church, and on it a drop of orange comes from a hill symbolizing gold mining. The flamboyant robe off bordura means patriotic movements, open book with the dates 1857-1917 constitutions, and bronze eagle with outspread wings means the country, holding a banner with the words "State of Sinaloa".

Culture and traditions

Carnival
The carnival has been held Mocorito years ago. The first day people gather expecting the identity of temper that evening burn is known. The second day is the crowning of the Queen of the Floral Games. On the third day takes place the coronation of the Queen of Carnival. On Sunday is the first tour of floats and bands. Monday is the coronation of the Kings and Children ride floats and to close with a flourish, on Tuesday performed the traditional walk, to the best allegorical cars and bands are rewarded and culminates with a large popular dance.

Music
The music could not miss as it is one of the deepest traditions. José Rubio Quinonez heir of the Sinaloa music, promoter of the popular bands of Sinaloa. The band "Los Hermanos Rubio Mocorito" has toured the country from Tijuana to Mexico City, playing the merry notes of the drum: sones "The Lost Child", "El Toro Viejo", "Brisas de Mocorito", "The Sinaloa "," El Palo Verde "and many more.

Characters and Artist of Mocorito
Mocorito was called at a time "The Athens of Sinaloa" as it has been distinguished by its innate vocation to the fine arts. It was the seat of a cultural range that is proud of Sinaloa. Several are in Mocorito found inspiration for their works whether literary, artistic, historical or transformative. The great muralist David Alfaro Siqueiros recalled that in this place joined the forces of revolution. When he was released he intended to return to the place as a symbolism reiterating its struggle for a better Mexico. JOSE RAMON VELAZQUEZ, writer of facts and anecdotes. Their stories come from the voices of people with their main theme is Mocorito. HECTOR LOPEZ GAMEZ, painter Mocoritense, majored in Law and Social Sciences obligation, then studied fine arts for fun in a US school. He leans in the human figure, landscapes and surreal themes.ERNESTO RIOS, painter and muralist Mocoritense. In the beginning he focused portrait of those who managed to make more than three thousand in four years later, mature, he was attracted by the murals have given popularity with shows several Mexican states projecting that done in Revolution Park Culiacan and the library of the Autonomous University of Sinaloa in Guamúchil. DR. ENRIQUE PEÑA GUTIERREZ, physician, poet and writer. He was part of a scientific committee that made the study of leprosy and tuberculosis in Sinaloa to the Mexican Academy of Medicine. Then he took up farming producing FERTIMOC, fertilizer helps to have increased production in crops. He edited the magazine "gaps" and wrote the book "Were Five Horse" among others. DR. JOSE DOMINGUEZ LAW, medical, humanitarian, philanthropist and social activist. Concerned about the village, founded the Ateneo Professor Constancio Rodriguez gave luster to Mocorito in the cultural both regionally and nationally, for its management connection to electricity CFE was achieved. The water system was introduced, the recognition of high school, health center, among others. He was a fighter always upright for unprotected world.

Flora and fauna
In Mocorito it is possible to perfectly identify the three climatic regions found in Sinaloa: tropical savannah on the west; mountain in the east and a transition zone in the central area. Three levels of vegetation are featured: conifers, oaks, oaks and pines in the high mountains; amapas, ebony, cedars and junipers in its foothills, and herbs and shrubs in the coastal area where mangroves thrive, guamuchileros, mesquite and wild figs. Most of the farmland are temporary, with crops such as rice, soybean, safflower, corn, cottonseed, sesame, beans, sorghum and cotton in bales, sugarcane, corn; fruits such as cantaloupe, watermelon, avocado, mango, orange and papaya.

The main breeds are cattle, pigs, goats and sheep. Among the wild animals, we find the deer, hare, rabbit, armadillo, iguana and others; and wild animals such as wild cat, tiger and lion living in the deepest mountain regions.

Climate

Important people from Mocorito
Los Tigres Del Norte

Danny Vizcarra (El Mocorito)

Socorro Rodriguez, defensive midfielder for the Garbanzeros de Guamuchil soccer team.

References

http://www.mocorito.com/ (in Spanish)
http://www.sinaloa.gob.mx/conociendo/municipios/mocorito.htm (in Spanish)

Populated places in Sinaloa
Populated places established in 1594